Essence International School (EIS) Essence International School founded by Mrs. D.L Mohammed (MFR) is located in a quiet corner of Kashim Ibrahim Road, in Kaduna Nigeria, a beautiful and dynamic city in Northern Nigeria. We are a four-tier institution offering quality instruction in an educationally stimulating atmosphere for students in kindergarten, nursery, primary, and secondary.

Founded in 1982, Essence began as a nursery school and expanded over the years to include all grades up to the final year of secondary school..

About EIS

At Essence International School, the students have the opportunity to learn in the context of their own culture and society. Essence encourages them to develop the skills necessary to succeed in those disciplines that are relevant to them and the society, as well as to make use of their creativity and talent. The creative, talented children do work that stretches beyond all boundaries - from sports, literature, innovative technology, art, design and architecture to drama, music and poetry. The world of ideas is wide open at Essence International School.

The Nursery Section is designed to build children's confidence, encourage their curiosity and nurture the development of the child's important skills and attitudes. There is a stimulating learning environment in which children develop an awareness and respect for others through games such as "I spy" or building blocks. The dedicated teachers and wonderful nannies ensure the children will have fun while they are teaching them.

African Heritage Village (AHV) Section
is a unique educational facility that offers students an advanced and innovative learning environment. The AHV has both Nursery and Primary Sections. Primary begins with Primary 1 and ends with Primary 6. The curriculum is based on both Nigerian and US standards, as well as many other countries. Students will be expected to not only grasp the subject material but also be able to apply it in an effective manner throughout their lifetime.

The Secondary Section , students are exposed to a wide range of opportunities and activities to develop their knowledge and skills. The curriculum provides an environment in which students are encouraged to pursue their interests through study-based learning and collaboration. This allows them to develop their academic skills and understanding of different disciplines.
The Secondary level offers a wide range of opportunities for all students to learn, grow and excel in the sciences and the arts. For Senior Secondary students, there are two major paths: Arts & Sciences or Pure Sciences. Both offer rich options for students to develop their knowledge and skills in many areas such as Biology, Fine Art, Chemistry, Physics and Technical Drawing among others. The school also has many sporting activities available for its students including football, basketball, swimming to mention a few.

Facilities

The campus includes a multi-purpose hall; a swimming pool; a theatre; and suites for computers, science labs, music, and tutorials. Often described as being "the most modern High School in Kaduna".

Notable alumni
Muhammad Sani Abdullahi
Nabil Abdulrashid
Muhammad Hafiz Bayero

References

External links

 Essence International School
 

International schools in Nigeria
Kaduna
1982 establishments in Nigeria
Educational institutions established in 1982